Nyaya Neethi Dharma is a 1980 Indian Kannada film directed by A. T. Raghu and produced by V. K. Ramesh. The film stars Ambareesh, Aarathi, Dwarakish and Sundar Krishna Urs in the lead roles. The film has musical score by Upendra Kumar.

Cast

References

External links
 

1980s Kannada-language films
Films scored by Upendra Kumar